William Burlington is a Canadian retired ice hockey center who was an All-American for Boston University.

Career
Burlington grew up hearing stories of his dad's hockey exploits. Tom Burlington was a star player for the Cleveland Barons in the 1940s but, due to only having vision in one eye, was never able to play in the National Hockey League. Bill followed in his father's footsteps and played junior hockey in the Owen Sound area, leading the entire junior-B level in scoring during the 1970–71 season. After that season, Burlington began attending Boston University and, despite the NCAA having changed their rules, the Terriers still had their first-year players serve on a freshman team. Burlington joined the varsity squad on the heels of back-to-back national championships and BU was looking to be just the second team to win three consecutive titles, but the team was upset by Pennsylvania in the first round of the conference tournament. 

After the 1973 season, BU was forced to forfeit 11 games for having used an ineligible player and the fallout would eventually lead to the firing of head coach Leon Abbott in the middle of Burlington's junior year. Despite the setback, new head coach Jack Parker was able to steady the ship and lead the Terriers to an ECAC championship in 1974. Burlington was just a point back of the team scoring lead and was named an All-American for the season. In his first NCAA tournament appearance, Burlington's team fell 4–5 in the semifinal to eventual champion Minnesota and finished third in the four-team field.

Burlington's senior season was nearly a repeat of his junior year with the Terriers winning an ECAC championship and finishing third in the NCAA Tournament. His scoring numbers were nearly identical as well, though he was not conferred any honors for the season.

After BU, Burlington continued his playing career and sought to win an Allan Cup as his father had done. While playing senior hockey, Burlington took time off to earn his B.A. from Lakehead University in 1978 but his playing career was ended abruptly after a serious injury in 1980. Burlington was slashed on the jaw, breaking the bone in 7 places. While recovering, Bill's dad helped him decide to end his playing career and begin the next chapter in his life.

Burlington and his future wife Cheryl travelled up to the Northwest Territories and began pursuing careers as educators. Bill became a gym teacher at Sir John Franklin High School in Yellowknife and spent more than 25 years teaching at the school. While coaching both the boys and girls hockey teams, Burlington continued to playing, winning 4 gold medals in hockey at the Arctic Winter Games.

Career statistics

Regular season and playoffs

Awards and honors

References

External links

1952 births
Living people
Canadian ice hockey centres
Ice hockey people from Ontario
Sportspeople from Owen Sound
Boston University Terriers men's ice hockey players
AHCA Division I men's ice hockey All-Americans